Romeo is a 1976 Indian Malayalam-language film,  directed by S. S. Nair. The film stars Sheela, Kaviyoor Ponnamma, Thikkurissy Sukumaran Nair and Bahadoor. The film has musical score by G. Devarajan.

Cast

Sheela
Kaviyoor Ponnamma
Thikkurissy Sukumaran Nair
Bahadoor
Jayasudha
M. G. Soman
Murali
Radhamani
Ravikumar

Soundtrack
The music was composed by G. Devarajan and the lyrics were written by Vayalar.

References

External links
 

1976 films
1970s Malayalam-language films